Tigilsky District is an administrative district (raion) of Koryak Okrug of Kamchatka Krai, Russia, one of the eleven in the krai. It is located in the west of the krai. Its administrative center is the rural locality (a selo) of Tigil. Population:  The population of Tigil accounts for 23.1% of the district's total population.

Ethnic composition (2010):
 Russians – 45.4%
 Koryaks – 28.7%
 Itelmens – 19.9%
 Ukrainians – 2.1%
 Others – 3.9%

Administrative and municipal status
Within the framework of administrative divisions, Tigilsky District is one of the eleven in the krai. The selo of Tigil serves as its administrative center.

As a municipal division, the territory of the district is split between two municipal formations—Tigilsky Municipal District, to which seven of the administrative district's rural localities belong, and Palana Urban Okrug, which covers the rest of the administrative district's territory, including the urban-type settlement of Palana.

References

Notes

Sources

Districts of Kamchatka Krai
